Jan Kotěra (18 December 1871 – 17 April 1923) was a Czech architect, artist and interior designer, and one of the key figures of modern architecture in Bohemia.

Biography
Kotěra was born in Brno, the largest city in Moravia, to a Czech father and German-speaking mother. He studied architecture in Vienna during the waning days of the Austro-Hungarian Empire under the Viennese master Otto Wagner.

Kotěra returned to Prague in 1897 to help found a dynamic movement of Czech nationalist artists and architects centered on the Mánes Union of Fine Arts. Strongly influenced by the work of the Vienna Secession, his work bridged late nineteenth-century architectural design and early modernism. Kotěra collaborated with Czech sculptors Jan Štursa, Stanislav Sucharda, and Stanislav's son Vojtěch Sucharda on a number of buildings.

As a teacher, Kotěra trained a generation of Czech architects, including Josef Gočár, who would bring Czech modernism to its pinnacle in the years leading up to the Nazi occupation in 1939. Kotěra was one of a number of Czech architects to design the "Bata houses" and Bata shoe factory at East Tilbury, Essex, England. These are considered Modernist landmarks of industry and a company town.

Works
 East Bohemian Museum in Hradec Králové,  (1908–1912)
 Peterka House, 12 Wenceslas Square, Prague (1899–1900)
 National House in Prostějov
 Trmalova Villa - an early rustic villa in Prague
 Villa of Tomáš Baťa in Zlín
 Faculty of Law at Charles University in Prague (1924–1927)
 Two monuments for members of the Perutz family at the New Jewish Cemetery

Gallery

References

External links

 
 Pictures from Hradec Králové museum
 List of works (in Czech)
 summary biography with images a

1871 births
1923 deaths
Architects from Brno
People from the Margraviate of Moravia
Czech nationalists
Moravian-German people